LEGEND are an Icelandic alternative rock/electronic band from Reykjavík.

History
LEGEND is an Icelandic duo, of Krummi Björgvinsson and Halldor Á. Björnsson, who release music under the Canadian label Artoffact Records. Björgvinsson who was previously the singer and songwriter for Mínus, acts as LEGEND's singer and manager. Their musical style is experimental, drawing on electronica, at times being classified as a form of 1980s Electro-industrial music. Their debut album, Fearless, has been compared with Nine Inch Nails and Depeche Mode.

Albums
 Fearless (2012)
 Midnight Champion (2017)

External links
 LEGEND Facebook page

References

Icelandic alternative rock groups
Icelandic electronic music groups
Musical groups established in 2012
Musical groups from Reykjavík
2012 establishments in Iceland